The 2003 Maryland Terrapins football team represented the University of Maryland in the 2003 NCAA Division I FBS football season. It was the Terrapins' 51st season as a member of the Atlantic Coast Conference (ACC). Ralph Friedgen led the team for his third season as head coach, while Charlie Taaffe served as the third-year offensive coordinator and Gary Blackney as the third-year defensive coordinator. Maryland finished the season with a 10–3 record. The Terrapins received an invitation to the Gator Bowl, where they defeated West Virginia, 41–7, in what was a rematch of a regular season game.

Schedule

2003 Terrapins in professional football
The following players were selected in the 2004 NFL Draft.

This squad would be loaded with future NFL players on top of the prior names whom were drafted including
DE Shawne Merriman
LB Jon Condo
LB D'Qwell Jackson
CB Domonique Foxworth
PK Nick Novak
P Adam Podlesh
TE Vernon Davis
CB Josh Wilson (American football)

References

Maryland
Maryland Terrapins football seasons
Gator Bowl champion seasons
Maryland Terrapins football